Events in the year 2018 in Bermuda.

Incumbents
 Monarch: Elizabeth II
 Governor: John Rankin
 Premier: Edward David Burt

Events

Sports 
9 to 25 February – Bermuda participated at the 2018 Winter Olympics in PyeongChang, South Korea, with 1 competitor in 1 sport (cross-country skiing).

Deaths

9 April – Ira Philip, writer and politician (b. 1925).

References

 
2010s in Bermuda
Years of the 21st century in Bermuda
Bermuda
Bermuda